Synergetics can refer to:

Synergetics (Fuller),  a study of systems behavior suggested by Buckminster Fuller
Synergetics (Haken),  a school of thought on thermodynamics and other systems phenomena developed by Hermann Haken

See also
Synergy (disambiguation) 
Tensegrity, the use of internal forces to overcome external forces, as in a self-supporting sculpture.